Fraxinus sieboldiana, the Chinese flowering ash or Japanese flowering ash, is a species of flowering plant in the family Oleaceae. It is native to southeastern China, the Korean peninsula, and Japan. It grows on wooded slopes and by streams. It is hardy to USDA zone 6. A variegated cultivar, 'Rising Sun', is available.

References

sieboldiana
Flora of Southeast China
Trees of Korea
Flora of Japan
Plants described in 1851